The 2018–19 Alpe Adria Cup was the fourth edition of this tournament. The season started on 25 September 2018. Egis Körmend won its first title.

Format
Sixteen teams from seven countries joined the competition and were divided into four groups of four teams, where the top two teams from each group will qualify for the quarterfinals.

Regular season

Group A

Group B

Group C

Group D

Playoffs

References

External links
Official website
Alpe Adria Cup at Eurobasket.com

2018–19
2018–19 in European basketball leagues
2018–19 in Croatian basketball
2018–19 in Slovenian basketball
2018–19 in Slovak basketball
2018–19 in Austrian basketball
2018–19 in Czech basketball